Nakalat Saare Ghadle is an Indian Marathi language television series aired on Star Pravah. It starred Nupur Parulekar and Harish Dudhade in lead roles. It's a remake of Yeh Hai Mohabbatein.

Cast 
 Nupur Parulekar as Neha
 Harish Dudhadhe as Pratap
 Radha Harane as Pari
 Surekha Kudachi
 Anuradha Rajadhyaksha
 Umesh Damle
 Ashish Gade
 Supreet Kadam
 Sarika Banaraswale
 Prasad Limaye
 Hitarth Patil
 Mayur Pawar
 Sudesh Mhashilkar
 Astad Kale

References

External links 
 
 Nakalat Saare Ghadle at Disney+ Hotstar
 
Marathi-language television shows
2017 Indian television series debuts
Star Pravah original programming
2019 Indian television series endings